Offstein in the Wonnegau is an Ortsgemeinde – a municipality belonging to a Verbandsgemeinde, a kind of collective municipality – in the Alzey-Worms district in Rhineland-Palatinate, Germany.

Geography 
The municipality lies in Rhenish Hesse and belongs to the Verbandsgemeinde of Monsheim, whose seat is in the like-named municipality. Geographically speaking, Offstein is located in the western area of the Rhine Rift Valley. The Eisbach, a small tributary situated west of the Rhine, runs through the southern part of the municipality. In terms of the type of settlement, Offstein is a clustered village. The lee of the surrounding low mountain ranges encourages its mild and arid climate. The fertile loess layers in this region render possible a productive agrarian economy.

Politics

Municipal council 
The council is made up of 16 council members, who were elected at the municipal election held on 7 June 2009, and the honorary mayor as chairman.

The municipal election held on 7 June 2009 yielded the following results:

Mayors 
 1975–1994 Otto Bergner (SPD)
 1994–2018: Robert Kuhn (independent)
 2019–present: Andreas Böll (SPD)

Economy and infrastructure 
In the neighbouring hamlet of Neuoffstein, which belongs to Obrigheim, is found the Südzucker-Werk Offstein, a sugar factory and Offstein's most important employer.

Famous people

Sons and daughters of the town 
Ernst Walter Görisch, Landrat of Alzey-Worms district.

References

External links 
Municipality’s official webpage 
Verbandsgemeinde of Monsheim 

Alzey-Worms